A teddy bear is a stuffed toy.

Teddy bear may also refer to:

Music

Bands
 The Teddy Bears, Phil Spector's first band
 Teddybears (band), a band from Stockholm, Sweden

Album
 Teddy Bear (single album), 2023 STAYC album

Songs
 "(Let Me Be Your) Teddy Bear", 1957 number one hit for Elvis Presley
 "Teddy Bear" (Red Sovine song), 1976
 Teddy Bear (STAYC song), 2023
 "Teddy Bear", a song from the album Duty by Ayumi Hamasaki
 "Teddybear", a 1997 song by Toy-Box
 "Teddy Bear", a song by Cheryl from A Million Lights (2012)
 "Teddy Bear", by Melanie Martinez from the digital deluxe edition of the album Cry Baby and the EP Cry Baby's Extra Clutter

Film and television
 The 'Teddy' Bears (1907 film)
 Teddy Bear (1981 film), English title of the 1981 Polish film Miś
 Teddy Bear (2007 film), a 2007 Czech comedy film directed by Jan Hřebejk
 Teddy Bear (2012 film), English title of the 2012 Danish film 10 Timer til Paradis
 Teddybears (TV series), a British children's television programme

Other uses
Teddy Bear, South Dakota, a ghost town in Pennington County, South Dakota, United States
 IDF Caterpillar D9, an Israeli armored bulldozer nicknamed "Doobi" ("teddy bear")
 Teddy bear, a variety of golden hamster
 Zuchon or teddy bear, a hybrid breed dog

See also
 Teddy (disambiguation)